Skin Cabin Creek is a  long 1st order tributary to the Ararat River in Surry County, North Carolina.  This is the only stream of this name in the United States.

Course
Skin Cabin Creek rises in a pond on the divide of an unnamed tributary to the Ararat River at Pine Hill, North Carolina.  Skin Cabin Creek then flows south and then east to join the Ararat River about 3 miles southeast of Pine Hill.

Watershed
Skin Cabin Creek drains  of area, receives about 47.5 in/year of precipitation, has a wetness index of 314.53, and is about 62% forested.

See also
List of rivers of North Carolina

References

Rivers of North Carolina
Rivers of Surry County, North Carolina